Eero Johannes Naapuri (29 December 1918, Lammi – 14 December 1987, Helsinki) was a Finnish Colonel and skier.

Naapuri was born in Lammi. He was the leader of the national Olympic military patrol team in 1948 which placed second. His military rank at his time was Kapteeni.
At the Nordic World Ski Championships 1950 he also finished second with his military patrol. He died in Helsinki.

External links 
 Picture of Eero Naapuri

References 

1918 births
1987 deaths
People from Hämeenlinna
Finnish military patrol (sport) runners
Olympic biathletes of Finland
Military patrol competitors at the 1948 Winter Olympics
Sportspeople from Kanta-Häme